Bad Vilbel Süd station is a railway station in the southern part of Bad Vilbel, Germany.

See also
 Bad Vilbel station

References

Railway stations in Hesse
Rhine-Main S-Bahn stations
Buildings and structures in Wetteraukreis